Museu da Lourinhã is a museum in the town of Lourinhã, west Portugal. It was founded in 1984 by GEAL - Grupo de Etnologia e Arqueologia da Lourinhã (Lourinhã's Group of Ethnology and Archeology). The president of the Direction Board is Lubélia Gonçalves.

The museum has very complete exhibits of archaeology and ethnology, but the main focus of the museum is the palaeontology hall, which presents casts of famous dinosaurs, as well as fossils recovered from the Late Jurassic Lourinhã Formation. Among these is the famous theropod nest found at the beach of Paimogo, which contains eggs with embryos inside, probably belonging to Lourinhanosaurus. Many of the fossils that belong to the Museu da Lourinhã are on display at Dinoparque Lourinhã, such as the sauropod Zby atlanticus, Lourinhanosaurus antunesi, and Torvosaurus gurneyi.

The paleontological research has been conducted by the paleontologists Miguel Telles Antunes, Octávio Mateus and others, in association with the Universidade Nova de Lisboa.

The museum receives about 25.000 visitors every year. 
The museum allows people to volunteer for its activities.

References

External links 
 

Museums established in 1984
Museums in Lisbon District
Archaeological museums in Portugal
Anthropology museums
Natural history museums in Portugal
Dinosaur museums